A Noise from the Deep is a 1913 American short silent comedy film starring Mabel Normand and Roscoe "Fatty" Arbuckle. The film was directed and produced by Mack Sennett and also features the Keystone Cops on horseback.

A Noise from the Deep still exists and was screened four times in 2006 in the Museum of Modern Art in New York City as part of a 56-film retrospective of all known surviving Arbuckle movies.

Overview
Normand throws the first pie known to ever be thrown on film in this ten-minute short about a gorgeous farm girl (Normand) in love with an obese farmhand (Arbuckle); the charming country couple wants to get married but are delayed by her father's insistence upon her choosing a different suitor.

The movie was the first pairing of Mabel Normand and Roscoe 'Fatty' Arbuckle, who went on to become a sensationally popular romantic screen team and made seventeen films together; writer/director/actress Normand, the most prominent silent movie comedian, was an almost equally frequent partner and mentor of Charles Chaplin during the same period.

Cast
 Mabel Normand as Mabel
 Roscoe 'Fatty' Arbuckle as Bob
 Charles Avery (uncredited minor role)
 Nick Cogley (uncredited minor role)
 Alice Davenport (uncredited minor role)
 William Hauber (uncredited minor role)
 Charles Inslee (uncredited minor role)
 Edgar Kennedy (uncredited minor role)
 Al St. John (uncredited minor role)

See also
 List of American films of 1913
 Fatty Arbuckle filmography

External links
 

1913 films
1913 comedy films
Silent American comedy films
American silent short films
American black-and-white films
Films directed by Mack Sennett
Keystone Studios films
1913 short films
American comedy short films
1910s American films